Arnaldo Saccomani (August 24, 1949 – August 27, 2020) was a Brazilian music producer, multi-instrumentalist and composer.

References

External links
Arnaldo Saccomani on Twitter
 

1949 births
2020 deaths
Brazilian composers
Brazilian singer-songwriters